Lloydminster Catholic School Division (LCSD) or Lloydminster R.C.S.S.D. No. 89 is a Catholic school division serving approximately 2,800 students in Lloydminster, SK/AB and surrounding area. Lloydminster Catholic School Division operates four elementary schools for grades K-7, one high school for grades 8-12 and one early childhood education center. It is currently the city's sole provider of single-track French Immersion education from grades K-12 through École St. Thomas Elementary School and Holy Rosary High School.

History

Lloydminster Catholic School Division was established in 1959 and opened its first school, St. Thomas, in 1961. St. Mary's School opened in 1963, initially serving students from grades 9 through 12. With the opening of the public Lloydminster Comprehensive High School in 1968, the Catholic school division relinquished responsibilities of grades 10 through 12 to the public school division and re-purposed St. Mary's School as a junior high school in 1969.

Due to growing enrollment across the division, Father Gorman Elementary School was built in 1977 followed by St. Joseph Elementary School in 1982. By 1985, the division had sufficient facility space and demand to offer Catholic education for grades 10 through 12. St. Mary's School became a high school and was renamed Holy Rosary High School. École St. Thomas also began to offer Lloydminster's first French Immersion program in 1985. 

Holy Rosary High School moved to a new facility in the fall of 2001, serving students Grades 8 through 12 with both English and French Immersion learning opportunities. The former facility was once again renamed St. Mary's School. The construction of the new Holy Rosary High School included adjacent office space for the division office. École St. Thomas School moved to a newly built facility in the fall of 2013, with the former building being re-purposed as Mother Teresa Early Childhood Education Center.

List of Schools
 Father Gorman Community School
 Holy Rosary High School
 St. Joseph Elementary School
 St. Mary's Elementary School
 École St. Thomas Elementary School
 Mother Teresa Early Childhood Education Center

References

External links
 Lloydminster Catholic School Division

School divisions in Saskatchewan
Roman Catholic schools in Saskatchewan
Lloydminster
School districts in Alberta
1959 establishments in Saskatchewan
1959 establishments in Alberta